Sarkan-e Olya (also Romanized as Sarkān-e ‘Olyā; also known as Sarākān ‘Olyā, Sarkān-e Bālā, Sarkūn-e Bāla, Sarkūn-e ‘Olyā, and Sarkūn ‘Olyā) is a village in Holayjan Rural District, in the Central District of Izeh County, Khuzestan Province, Iran. At the 2006 census, its population was 598, in 117 families.

References 

Populated places in Izeh County